Les Tuche 2 - Le rêve américain is a 2016 French comedy film directed by Olivier Baroux. It is the sequel to Les Tuche. It earned over US$32.5 million and was the highest-grossing domestic film in France in 2016, with 4,619,884 tickets sold.

Cast
 Jean-Paul Rouve as Jeff Tuche
 Isabelle Nanty as Cathy Tuche
 Claire Nadeau as Grandma Suze
 Théo Fernandez as Donald Tuche
 Sarah Stern as Stéphanie Tuche
 Pierre Lottin as Wilfried Tuche
 Ralph Amoussou as Georges Diouf
 Darrell Dennis as Indian

Release
Les Tuche 2 was distributed by Pathé in France.

Reception
The Hollywood Reporter gave the film a negative review, finding the films comedy as "puerile and naive whenever it’s not straightforwardly moronic", noting a list of American clichés and that "like in local box-office monsters Intouchables and Serial (Bad) Weddings, what passes for crude humor in France can be perceived as racially insensitive in the U.S. and elsewhere". The review commented on the writing as "staggeringly lazy and unfocused".

References

External links 
 

2016 films
2010s French-language films
French comedy films
2016 comedy films
Pathé films
French sequel films
Films directed by Olivier Baroux
2010s French films
Foreign films set in the United States